A kinin is any of various structurally related polypeptides, such as bradykinin and kallidin. They are members of the autacoid family. Kinins are peptides that are cleaved from kininogens by the process of kallikreins. Kallikreins activate kinins when stimulated.

It is a component of the kinin-kallikrein system.

Their precursors are kininogens. Kininogens contain a 9-11 amino acid bradykinin sequence.

In botany, the plant hormones known as cytokinins were first called kinins, but the name was changed to avoid confusion.

Effects of Kinins 
Kinin are short lived peptides that cause pain sensation, arteriolar dilation, increase vascular permeability and cause contractions in smooth muscle. Kinins transmit their effects through G protein- coupled receptors.

Kinin act on axons to block nervous impulses, which leads to distal muscle relaxation. Kinin are also potent nerve stimulators. which is mostly responsible for the sense of pain (and sometimes itching). Kinin increase vascular permeability by acting on vascular endothelial cells to cause cell contraction. Concomitantly they induce local expression of adhesive molecules. Together they increase leukocytes adhesion and extravasation. Kinin are rapidly inactivated by the proteases locally generated during the above mentioned processes.

They act locally to induce vasodilation and contraction of smooth muscle. Kinins function as mediators for inflammatory responses by triggering the immune system. They are also able to regulate cardiovascular and renal function through mediating the effects of ACE inhibitors. Reduced kinin activity can result in high blood pressure, sodium retention and the narrowing of blood vessels.

Aspirin inhibits the activation of kallenogen by interfering with the formation of kallikrein  enzyme which is essential in the process of activation.

Where kinins are produced 
Kinins are mostly produced at inflamed or injured tissue of the body and human body fluids. Kinin peptides (kallidin and bradykinin) are located in human blood and urine.

Kinin Receptors 
There are two types of kinin receptors, B1 and B2. B1 receptors are G-protein coupled receptors that are induced by injured tissue. The quantity of B2 receptors in the human body, exceed B1 receptors.

History 
Kinin was initially discovered by J.E. Abelous and E. Bardier in 1909 when performing experiments utilizing human body fluids. Human body fluids such as urine was injected into dogs and it was observed that the urine caused a reduction in blood pressure.

References

External links 
The kinin-forming system at nic.sav.sk

Kinin–kallikrein system